Laurie Brown (born 1978) is an American photographer. 

Her work is included in the collections of the Los Angeles County Museum of Art,  the Museum of Fine Arts Houston, the Philadelphia Museum of Art and the Museum of Fine Arts Houston.

References

Living people
1978 births
20th-century American photographers
21st-century American photographers
20th-century American women artists
21st-century American women artists